Chaperonin ATPase (chaperonin) is an enzyme with systematic name ATP phosphohydrolase (polypeptide-unfolding). This enzyme catalyses the following chemical reaction

 ATP + H2O  ADP + phosphate

These enzymes are a subclass of molecular chaperones.

See also 
 Chaperonin

References

External links 
 

EC 3.6.4